The Princess of the Ursines (Spanish:La princesa de los ursinos) is a 1947 Spanish historical film directed by Luis Lucia and starring Ana Mariscal. It was made by CIFESA, Spain's largest studio at the time. The film is loosely based on real events that took place in the eighteenth century reign of Philip V of Spain.

Cast

References

Bibliography
 Mira, Alberto. The A to Z of Spanish Cinema. Rowman & Littlefield, 2010. 
 Triana-Toribio, Núria. Spanish National Cinema. Routledge, 2012.

External links 

1947 films
Spanish historical drama films
1940s historical drama films
1940s Spanish-language films
Films directed by Luis Lucia
Films set in the 18th century
Cifesa films
Spanish black-and-white films
1940s Spanish films